Andrew Choi (Hangul: 앤드류 최; Korean name: Choi Sung-hyun; Hangul: 최승주, born December 25, 1980) was a South Korean singer and composer signed under SM Entertainment. He was known as third place of SBS's K-pop Star Season 2. He released his first album, Love Was Enough on May 27, 2013.

Background
Choi was born in Busan on December 25, 1980, but grew up in the United States.

Discography

Other work

Filmography

Television

References

External links 

 

1980 births
Living people
South Korean rhythm and blues singers
South Korean pop singers
People from Busan
K-pop Star participants
Rutgers University alumni
21st-century South Korean male  singers